Miguel Ángel Sancho Rubio (born 24 April 1990) is a Spanish high jumper and mathematician.

He was born in Valencia. He finished fourth at the 2007 World Youth Championships and won the bronze medal at the 2008 World Junior Championships. He also competed at the 2009 European Indoor Championships without reaching the final.

His personal best jump is 2.26 metres, achieved in August 2011 in Málaga. He has 2.27 metres on the indoor track, achieved in February 2009 in San Sebastián.

Competition record

1No mark in the final

References

1990 births
Living people
Sportspeople from Valencia
Spanish male high jumpers
Competitors at the 2011 Summer Universiade
Competitors at the 2013 Summer Universiade